The  (‘Public Palace’) is the town hall of the City of San Marino as well as its official Government Building. The building, where official State ceremonies take place, is the seat of the Republic's main institutional and administrative bodies: the Captains Regent, the Grand and General Council, the Council of XII, and the Congress of State.

The main section of the building is topped by battlements over a series of corbels. The clock tower above also features such an arrangement with battlements and corbels. The overall design is similar to the Palazzo Vecchio in Florence, but on a much smaller scale.

Located on the site of an ancient building called the Domus Magna Comunis, the current building was designed by the Roman architect Francesco Azzurri and was built between 1884 and 1894. After a hundred years of existence, it was becoming unsafe in today's standards, so a complex restoration project was undergone. The intervention was completed by the internationally renowned architect Gae Aulenti on 30 September 1996.

References

Buildings and structures in the City of San Marino
Seats of local government in Europe
Presidential residences
Government buildings completed in 1894